Kostadin Zelenkov (born 11 December 1977) is a Bulgarian football player, currently playing for Brestnik 1948 as a midfielder.

References

1977 births
Living people
Bulgarian footballers
First Professional Football League (Bulgaria) players
Second Professional Football League (Bulgaria) players
PFC Spartak Pleven players
PFC Vidima-Rakovski Sevlievo players
FC Lyubimets players
FC Chernomorets Balchik players

Association football midfielders